Christian Hollow is a valley in Reynolds County in the U.S. state of Missouri.

Christian Hollow bears the name of a pioneer citizen.

References

Valleys of Reynolds County, Missouri
Valleys of Missouri